Juan José Urruti (born May 24, 1962, in Rosario) is a former Argentine footballer. He played for a number of clubs in Argentina, Spain, Bolivia and Chile.

Career
Urruti started his professional career in 1979 with Racing de Córdoba. In 1980 Racing got to the final of the Nacional championship but eventually lost to Rosario Central.

In 1983 Urruti was signed by Valencia after a deal to buy his Racing Club teammate Luis Amuchástegui fell through at the last minute. Urruti played for Valencia until 1986, but he only managed to score 8 goals in 74 games.

In 1986 Urruti returned to Argentina to play for Rosario Central, he was part of the team that won the 1986–87 championship.

In 1988 Urruti was signed by Bolívar in Bolivia, he won two Bolivian league championships either side of a brief return to Argentina in 1991 to play for Club Atlético Platense.

In 1993 Urruti joined Jorge Wilstermann where he won another Bolivian league championship in 1994. He joined San José in 1996 and played out his career with Huachipato in Chile in 1997.

Personal life
With his wife, Claudia Mussa, Urruti has a son Maximiliano who is a professional footballer and plays for Austin FC in the MLS.

Honours
Rosario Central
 Argentine Primera División: 1986–87

Bolívar
 Liga de Fútbol Profesional Boliviano: 1988, 1992

Wilstermann
 Liga de Fútbol Profesional Boliviano: 1994

References

External links
 Valencia player profile

1962 births
Living people
Footballers from Rosario, Santa Fe
Argentine footballers
Argentine expatriate footballers
Argentine Primera División players
Association football forwards
Racing de Córdoba footballers
Valencia CF players
Rosario Central footballers
Club Bolívar players
Club Atlético Platense footballers
C.D. Jorge Wilstermann players
Club San José players
C.D. Huachipato footballers
Chilean Primera División players
Argentine expatriate sportspeople in Spain
Expatriate footballers in Spain
Expatriate footballers in Chile
Expatriate footballers in Bolivia
Argentine expatriate sportspeople in Bolivia
Argentine expatriate sportspeople in Chile
Argentina youth international footballers
Argentina under-20 international footballers
Argentina international footballers